The Cornelius Sullivan House, in Hillsboro, New Mexico, was built in 1893.  It was listed on the National Register of Historic Places in 1995.

It is located on the southwest corner of the junction of Elenora and 1st Ave. in Hillsboro.

It is an adobe, one-story, L-shaped, New Mexico Vernacular house.

References

New Mexico vernacular architecture
National Register of Historic Places in Sierra County, New Mexico
Houses completed in 1893